In mathematics, and particularly ordinary differential equations, a characteristic multiplier is an eigenvalue of a monodromy matrix. The logarithm of a characteristic multiplier is also known as characteristic exponent. They appear in Floquet theory of periodic differential operators and in the Frobenius method.

See also 

 Multiplier (disambiguation)

References

External links

Examples of finding characteristic multipliers of systems of ODEs from www.exampleproblems.com.

Ordinary differential equations